My Friend Irma is an American radio and television series of the 1940s and 1950s.

My Friend Irma may refer to:

My Friend Irma (TV series), the TV adaptation of the radio series

My Friend Irma (film), a 1949 film directed by George Marshall, based upon the radio series

See also
My Friend Irma Goes West, a 1950 film